The Southern Utah Thunderbirds women's basketball team is the women's basketball team that represents Southern Utah University in Cedar City, Utah. They currently compete in the Western Athletic Conference.

History
Southern Utah began play in 1975. Southern Utah won their first confernce tournament title in 2023 in the Western Athletic Conference.

Postseason

NCAA Division I
The Thunderbirds have made one appearance in the NCAA Division I women's basketball tournament, with a combined record of TBD.

NAIA Division I
The Thunderbirds made one appearance in the NAIA Women's Basketball Championships, with a combined record of 0–1.

References

External links